Utricularia tetraloba is a very small, probably perennial, rheophytic carnivorous plant that belongs to the genus Utricularia. U. tetraloba is endemic to Guinea and Sierra Leone. It was originally described and published by Peter Taylor in 1963. It is distinguished from the other species in the section, U. rigida, by having four lower lip corolla lobes as opposed to U. rigida's two.

See also 
 List of Utricularia species

References 

Carnivorous plants of Africa
Flora of Guinea
Flora of Sierra Leone
tetraloba